Sir Philip Bridger Proctor KBE (1870 - 3 December 1940) was a British businessman who served as Director of Meat Supplies, Ministry of Food, 1919–21. For his wartime service, he was knighted in 1920.

He was educated at St Paul's School. He married Nellie Eliza Shaul in 1897; they had one daughter and one son, Sir Dennis Proctor.

References
  "PROCTOR, Sir Philip Bridger", Who Was Who, A & C Black, an imprint of Bloomsbury Publishing plc, 1920–2008; online edn, Oxford University Press, December 2007; accessed 28 December 2012.

1870 births
1940 deaths
People educated at St Paul's School, London
Knights Commander of the Order of the British Empire
Place of birth missing
Place of death missing